Albert Legogie (1947 - 17 June 2013) was a Nigerian politician. He was a member of the Senate for Edo North.

Senator Albert Legogie was a former deputy senate president in the defunct Third Republic and a pioneer member of the Board of Trustees of the Peoples Democratic Party (PDP).

Death
Legogie died on 17 June 2013 at the age of 76.

References

2013 deaths
Nigerian politicians
1947 births